Strikes and Gutters 2: Doublewide is an album by Pittsburgh rock band The Clarks, their second outtake album. It was released in 2004.

Track listing 
 "Queen of America"
 "Rise and Fall"
 "Save Me"
 "Upside Down"
 "Old Friend"
 "The Ship is Going Down"
 "The River"
 "I'm a Fool"
 "Snowman"
 "The Truth Will Set You Free"
 "Brand New"
 "What's Going On"
 "Cigarette" (No Smoking Mix)
 "Holiday Season"
The CD also contained a purposefully hidden track that came after "Holiday Season" and was a parody of Dr. Seuss with lyrics about recreational drug use.

Personnel 
 Scott Blasey - lead vocals, electric & acoustic guitars
 Rob James - electric & acoustic guitars, vocals, Vocal turn on "Holiday Season"
 Greg Joseph - bass guitar, vocals, Lead Vocals on "Queen of America" and "Holiday Season"
 Dave Minarik - drums, vocals, Vocal turn on "Holiday Season"

2004 albums
The Clarks albums